Where You at World Tour (sometimes referred to as the WYAT Tour) was the first major concert tour by Filipino boy band SB19 launched in support of their single, "WYAT (Where You At)" (2022). The tour was announced in September 2022 embarking its first show at the Araneta Coliseum on September 17, 2022. Additional tour dates was announced for America, Asia and Middle East. The first show held at Smart Araneta Coliseum was sold out within 24 hours after ticket released to the general public.

Background

For the first whole week of August, SB19 has been teasing their comeback. On August 12, SB19 released the single comeback title "WYAT (Where You At)", a disco-pop song that highlights the urgency of disconnection to reconnection of the times that should be releasing on September 2 with an official music video and a global concert tour kickoff in Manila on September 17 in Araneta Coliseum. The group's social media, especially Twitter, has erupted over the last few days after the boy group released a series of cryptic riddles and videos that led fans to speculate about a world tour. As a result, the hashtag #WhereIsSB19 has been trending on Twitter worldwide daily. SB19 released their final video of the series announcing that the single and tour will be launched in September. Few cities in the Philippines were included on the tours after Quezon City Metro Manila. The group announced the remaining concert dates for Clark City, Cebu City and Davao City on September 4, 2022. After which, the band will bring the concert internationally with additional tour dates placed for Singapore, UAE and United States. Member, Josh revealed that this would be their first time holding their own concert overseas and expressed his excitement to meet their international fans. The group also teases more additional leg for the tour which is still unannounced.

Marketing
On August 18, 2022, the group released the official poster for the world tour in their Facebook account officially announcing its kick-off at the Smart Araneta Coliseum. On September 2, they released the music video for their comeback single "WYAT (Where You At)", from which the tour name was derived from. This is SB19's first comeback since the release of their EP Pagsibol in 2021. On September 4, a one-minute teaser has been uploaded in their Twitter account, unveiling the confirmed cities and dates for the tour.

Set list
The following set list is representative of the show on September 17, 2022. It is not representative of all concerts for the duration of the tour.

"What?"
"Mana"
"Hanggang sa Huli"
"Nyebe"
"Attention" 
"Bazinga!"
"Mapa"
"Alab"
"Tilaluha"
"Bakit Ba Ikaw"
"WYAT (Where You At)"
"Love Yours"
"Go Up"
"SLMT"

Shows

References

External links

 



2022 concert tours
SB19 concert tours